This is a list of the operas performed by Salzburg Festival during the music directorship of Arturo Toscanini and Bruno Walter (1935–1937). This period was ended by the invasion and annexation of the Republic of Austria by Nazi Germany in March 1938. Arturo Toscanini, an avid opponent of the Nazi regime, thereafter declined to return to Salzburg. Bruno Walter was forced to flee to the United States.

New opera productions 
The period 1935 to 1937 was extremely successful for the Salzburg Festival. The percentage of tickets sold rose from 53% in 1934 to 89% in 1937. Each year during this period, Arturo Toscanini presented one new production of an opera suitable to the Salzburg atmosphere. He insisted on major funding and the best available singers. In 1935 he presented Giuseppe Verdi's last opera, Falstaff, performed for the first time at the Salzburg Festival. His choice of Wagner's Meistersinger von Nürnberg in 1936 was seen as an act of opposition to the Bayreuth Festival, insisting that this opera belongs to the cultural heritage of the world and not to Nazi Germany. His last Salzburg premiere was dedicated to the genius loci, Wolfgang Amadeus Mozart, and his masterpiece Die Zauberflöte. Another political statement of Toscanini was that each year he conducted Beethoven's freedom opera Fidelio, a masterpiece against tyranny.

Meanwhile, Bruno Walter, who was the only conductor fully accepted by Toscanini, concentrated on majors works by Mozart, presented a highly acclaimed production of Glucks Orfeo ed Euridice, and expanded the Salzburg repertory by adding rarely performed operas like Wolfs Der Corregidor and Webers Euryanthe. He, too, insisted on conducting Wagner in Salzburg – Tristan und Isolde with a splendid cast led by Anny Konetzni and Josef Kalenberg.

1935

1936

1937

Repertory 
In addition to the new productions, the following works from the repertory were performed at the Salzburg Festival.

1935 
 Così fan tutte, cond. Felix von Weingartner, August 5 and 19
 Don Giovanni, cond. Bruno Walter, August 1, 8, 15, 23 and 28
 Fidelio, cond. Arturo Toscanini, August 7, 14, 24 and 31
 Le nozze di Figaro, cond. Felix von Weingartner, August 13 and 30
 Der Rosenkavalier, cond. Josef Krips, July 30, August 9 und 27
 Tristan und Isolde, cond. Bruno Walter, July 27

1936 
 Così fan tutte, cond. Felix von Weingartner, July 29 and August 25
 Don Giovanni, cond. Bruno Walter, July 28, August 4, 13 and 24
 Falstaff, cond. Arturo Toscanini, July 31, August 10, 20 and 26
 Fidelio, cond. Arturo Toscanini, July 25, August 5, 16 and 31
 Le nozze di Figaro, cond. Felix von Weingartner, July 27 and August 29
 Tristan und Isolde, cond. Bruno Walter, August 27

1937 
 Don Giovanni, cond. Bruno Walter, August 2, 13 and 28
 Elektra, cond. Hans Knappertsbusch, August 8 and 22
 Falstaff, cond. Arturo Toscanini, July 26, August 9 and 23
 Fidelio, cond. Arturo Toscanini, August 24 and 26
 Die Meistersinger von Nürnberg, cond. Arturo Toscanini, August 5, 12 and 20
 Orfeo ed Euridice, cond. Bruno Walter, July 31 and August 14
 Der Rosenkavalier, cond. Hans Knappertsbusch, July 27, August 6 and 24

Salzburg Festival: history and repertoire, 1922–1926
 Salzburg Festival: history and repertoire, 1922–1926

Sources

References

History and repertoire, 1935–37, Salzburg Festival
Opera-related lists
1935 music festivals
1936 music festivals
1937 music festivals